Wilhelm is a German given name, and a cognate of the English name William. The feminine form is Wilhelmine.

People with the given name
 Wilhelm I, German Emperor (1797–1888), King of Prussia and German Emperor
 Wilhelm II, German Emperor (1859–1941), grandson of the former, King of Prussia and German Emperor
 Prince Wilhelm (disambiguation)
 Wilhelm Boger (1906–1977), German police officer and one of the SS staff at Auschwitz concentration camp
 Wilhelm Burgdorf (1895–1945), Germany Army commander and staff officer during World War II
 Wilhelm Dörr (Nazi) (1921–1945), German SS and concentration camp officer executed for war crimes
 Wilhelm Frick (1877–1946), German Nazi politician, executed for war crimes
 Wilhelm Fuchs (1898–1947), German Nazi SS officer and Holocaust perpetrator executed for war crimes
 Wilhelm Furtwängler (1886–1954), German conductor and composer, leader of the Berlin and Vienna Philharmonic Orchestra
 Wilhelm Gerstenmeier (1908–1944), German SS concentration camp officer executed for war crimes
 Wilhelm Gideon (1898–1977), German Nazi SS commandant of the concentration camp Gross-Rosen
 Wilhelm Grimm (1786–1859), German anthropologist
 Wilhelm Göcke (1898–1944), German Nazi SS concentration camp commandant
 Wilhelm Heinrich Erb (1840–1921), German neurologist
 Wilhelm Hetling (1740–1798), Baltic-German politician and the first mayor of Reval (modern-day Tallinn)
 Wilhelm von Humboldt (1767–1835), Prussian philosopher and diplomat
 Wilhelm Imkamp (born 1951), German Catholic prelate
 Wilhelm Keitel (1882–1946), German Nazi field marshal, executed for war crimes
 Wilhelm List (1880–1971), German field marshal
 Wilhelm Niklas (1887–1957), German academic and politician
 Wilhelm Reich (1897–1957), Austrian-American psychiatrist and psychoanalyst
 Wilhelm Rietschel (1911–1941), German sculptor
 Wilhelm Ruppert (1905–1946), SS trooper in charge of executions at Dachau concentration camp executed for war crimes
 Wilhelm Schitli (1912–1945 (missing)), German Nazi SS concentration camp commandant
 Wilhelm Trapp (1889–1948), German Nazi policeman, executed for war crimes
 Wilhelm Richard Wagner (1813–1883), German composer, theatre director, polemicist, and conductor
 Wilhelm Weitling (1808–1871), early German communist or socialist
 Wilhelm Wien (1864–1928), Nobel Prize Winner in 1911 and scientist who created Wien's Displacement Law
 Wilhelm Woutersz (1939–2003), Sri Lankan Burgher diplomat
 Wilhelm Wundt (1832–1920), German doctor and psychologist

Fictional characters with the given name 
 Colonel Wilhelm Klink in Hogan's Heroes
 Wilhelm van Astrea, a character in the light novel series Re:Zero − Starting Life in Another World
 Noiz (Wilhelm), a character from the Japanese visual novel, DRAMAtical Murder
 Wilhelm "Deathshead" Strasse, Nazi general from the Wolfenstein series
 Wilhelm, a character in Xenosaga video games
 Wilhelm Ryan, Supreme Trimage in The Amory Wars
 Wilhelm Wicki, a character in the 2009 film, Inglourious Basterds
 Wilhelm Winter, an officer in Generation War.
 Wilhelm, a cyborg from the Borderlands series
 Wilhelm, servant in the manga Ludwig Kakumei
 Wilhelm, crown prince of Sweden, Young Royals

People with the surname 
 Anette Wilhelm (born 1972), Swedish wheelchair curler
 Bill Wilhelm (1929–2010), American college baseball coach
 Bruce Wilhelm (born 1945), American former weightlifter strongman, twice winner of the World's Strongest Man competition, in 1977 and 1978
 Carl Wilhelm (1885–1936), German film director, film producer and screenwriter of the silent film era
 Eugène Wilhelm (1866–1951), French lawyer and sexologist
 Hellmut Wilhelm (1905–1990), German Sinologist
 Hoyt Wilhelm (1923–2002), American major league baseball pitcher
 Karl Wilhelm (disambiguation)
 Kate Wilhelm (1928–2018), American writer
 Kati Wilhelm (born 1976), German biathlete
 Manuel Wilhelm, German rugby union player
 Mary Jo Wilhelm, American politician
 Matthew Wilhelm, American politician
 Richard Wilhelm (disambiguation)
 Stephen Wilhelm (1919–2002), American phytopathologist
 Thomas Wilhelm (born 1971), Swedish curler and curling coach
 Warren Wilhelm, birth name of Bill de Blasio (born 1961), American politician and current mayor of New York
 William Charles John Pitcher (1858–1925), British costume designer of the Victorian era and Edwardian period

Fictional characters with the surname 
 Mr. Wilhelm, a recurring minor character in Seinfeld
 Reinhardt Wilhelm, a tank hero in Overwatch

See also 
 
 
 Wilhelm (disambiguation)

References 

German-language surnames
German masculine given names
English masculine given names
Surnames from given names